Count Carlo Pellion di Persano (11 March 1806 – 28 July 1883)  was an Italian naval officer and politician, who was commander of the Regia Marina fleet at the 1866 Battle of Lissa.

Persano was born at Vercelli in the Kingdom of Sardinia on 11 March 1806. As a young man Persano joined the Royal Sardinian Navy and advanced rapidly through the ranks. He commanded the fleet from 1860 to 1861, and saw action in the struggle for Italian unification. After unification he was elected to the legislature; he became Minister of Marine in 1862 and in 1865 he was nominated a Senator.

Persano was appointed to command the Italian fleet during the Third Italian War of Independence, and, despite his warnings about the poor state of his ships and his men, he set sail and suffered a defeat at the Battle of Lissa. To quell the public outcry in Italy after the defeats of Lissa and Custoza, Persano was judged by the Italian Senate (which alone had the authority to judge a sitting Senator), condemned for incompetence on 15 April 1867 and cashiered from duty.

He died at Turin on 28 July 1883.

Notes

1806 births
1883 deaths
People from Vercelli
Italian admirals
19th-century Italian people
Members of the Senate of the Kingdom of Italy